EHO may refer to:
 Environmental health officer
 Shelby–Cleveland County Regional Airport, in North Carolina, United States
 European History Online
 Extra heavy oil

See also 
 Echo (disambiguation)